Cemetery for North Korean and Chinese Soldiers (also known as the Enemy Cemetery) located in Jajang-Ro, Papyeong-myeon (파평면), Paju, South Korea, is a burial ground for North Korean casualties of the Korean War and North Korean agents killed in South Korea since the end of the war. The cemetery formerly contained the remains of 437 Chinese People's Volunteer Army soldiers but these were all repatriated in March 2014.

History
The cemetery was established in July 1996 as a centralized burial place for the remains of Korean People's Army and People's Volunteer Army soldiers recovered from battlefield exhumations across South Korea and for North Korean agents killed in South Korea since the end of the Korean War.

North Korea has refused to accept the repatriation of the remains of its personnel on the basis that North Korea claims sovereignty over all of Korea and the soldiers accordingly are already buried on Korean soil. Also, the acceptance of the bodies of agents would amount to acknowledgment of espionage operations denied by North Korea.

The graves are in the form of traditional Korean burial mounds with plain wooden markers facing north towards North Korea (approximately 5 kilometers away). The majority of the graves are marked 무명 (Pronunciation: mumyeong= Korean word: meaning = anonymous), while those of North Korean agents are marked with 간첩 (Pronunciation: gancheop = Korean word:  meaning=  spy) followed by the name if known. The cemetery receives few visitors because the South Korean intelligence services monitored the site to detect North Korean sympathizers, though the services say they no longer monitor the site.

South Korea had previously returned the remains of Chinese soldiers to North Korea through the Neutral Nations Supervisory Commission which then repatriated them to China. From 1981 to 1989, 42 sets of remains were returned in this manner, however in 1997, North Korea refused to accept any further Chinese remains. Following a visit by South Korean President Park Geun-hye to Beijing in June 2013, it was agreed that the remains of the Chinese soldiers would be repatriated directly to China. The exhumation of the remains started in December 2013 and on 17 March 2014, the repatriation of the remains of the 437 Chinese soldiers took place. 55 of the sets of remains were identified while the rest were unknowns. The remains are to be interred in the Resist America and Aid Korea Martyrs Cemetery in Shenyang, China.

Renovation plans for the cemetery were considered in 2012, but they met with opposition in South Korea and were not carried out.

Notable burials
 The 29 members of Unit 124 killed in the Blue House raid in 1968
 Kim Sung-il, North Korean agent responsible for the bombing of Korean Air Flight 858 in 1987

See also

 Daejeon National Cemetery
 Seoul National Cemetery
 United Nations Memorial Cemetery, in Busan, South Korea

References

External links
 BBC News March 2016 report on repatriation of Chinese remains with video filed at the Cemetery
 

1996 establishments in South Korea
Aftermath of the Korean War
Cemeteries in South Korea
Korean War memorials and cemeteries
Monuments and memorials in South Korea